An adjudicator is someone who presides, judges, and arbitrates during a formal dispute or competition. They have numerous purposes, including preliminary legal judgments, to determine applicant eligibility, or to assess contenders' performance in competitions.

Types

Arbiters 
An example is a person who makes a preliminary judgment as to an unemployment insurance claim.  An adjudicator makes an initial decision to keep a case from going to court. Although the adjudicator's decision does not have legal weight, the adjudicator has rendered a decision. Although a case can be appealed to a judge, the adjudicator's decision is frequently accepted as the same as what a judge would make, keeping many time-consuming cases out of the court system.

Decision-making panels 
The term is used to refer to a panel of judges in the process of considering security clearances for the United States government. The panel reviews information from a background investigation and a polygraph and decides whether to grant the clearance. Adjudicators can be a medical review board that makes disability and retirement benefit decisions for Federal employees and military personnel. Adjudicators also exist for immigration benefits.

Official evaluations  
An adjudicator (often referred to as a "judge", "umpire", "arbiter", or more archaically as a "daysman"), is a person who gives a critical evaluation of performances in competitions, festivals or talent shows, resulting in the award of marks, medals or prizes.

In BP debate, an adjudicator weighs arguments and decides rankings in the house. There are different types of adjudicators, each with their respective duties and levels of authority: chair, panelist, and trainee. In the event that the chair is the chief adjudicator of the tournament, they are referred to as "Speaker".

References

Sources 
 Adjudicators Field Manual, United States Department of Homeland Security, Citizenship and Immigration Services

Legal professions
Scots law general titles
Law of the United Kingdom